The 1892 Arkansas gubernatorial election was held on September 5, 1892.

Incumbent Democratic Governor James Philip Eagle did not stand for re-election.

Democratic nominee William Meade Fishback defeated Republican nominee William G. Whipple and Populist nominee Jacob P. Carnahan with 57.70% of the vote.

General election

Candidates
William Meade Fishback, Democratic, former member of the Arkansas House of Representatives
William G. Whipple, Republican, former mayor of Little Rock
Jacob P. Carnahan, Populist, teacher
William J. Nelson, Prohibition

Results

Notes

References

1892
Arkansas
Gubernatorial